Eva Goes Aboard (Swedish: Eva går ombord) is a 1934 Swedish comedy film directed by Lorens Marmstedt and starring Einar Axelsson,  Astrid Marmstedt and Emy Hagman. It was shot in Stockholm and Gothenburg with footage use from a variety of locations the ship calls at including Egypt, Monaco, India and Kenya.

Synopsis
When Eva Lindström, an employee in a fashion store, discovers  cruise tickets in the name of Bo Stensjö in the back of a taxi. She whimsically boards the ship pretending to be his wife, and manages to pull off the deception with the help of her friend Ebba who works onboard. When the real Bo Stensjö comes aboard at Naples he plays along with this, and quickly falls in love with her. However, she is now wanted in Sweden as she went missing wearing expensive clothes and jewels that belonged to the store.

Cast
 Einar Axelsson as Bo Stensjö
 Astrid Marmstedt as 	Eva Lindström
 Emy Hagman as 	Ebba
 Lili Ziedner as 	Mrs. Krook
 Åke Söderblom as Steward
 Birgitta Hede as 	Marianne
 Emma Meissner as 	Passenger
 Eric Abrahamsson as 	Boman
 Hjördis Petterson as 	Mrs. Johnson
 Olga Appellöf as Passenger 
 Benkt-Åke Benktsson as Lundberg 
 Bror Berger as 	Mannen med kofferten 
 Karin Granberg as 	Passenger 
 Harry Hasso as Slave trader in Mombasa 
 Anna Olin as 	Fat lady on the train 
 Ruth Weijden as 	Clerk 
 Alf Östlund as Passenger

References

Bibliography 
 Qvist, Per Olov & von Bagh, Peter. Guide to the Cinema of Sweden and Finland. Greenwood Publishing Group, 2000.

External links 
 

1934 films
Swedish comedy films
1934 comedy films
1930s Swedish-language films
Films directed by Lorens Marmstedt
Swedish black-and-white films
Seafaring films
Films set in Monaco
Films set in Gothenburg
Films set in Stockholm
Films set in Naples
1930s Swedish films